Dharumapuram Aadheenam is a Saivite monastic institution based in the town of Mayiladuthurai, Tamil Nadu. As of 2019, there were a total of 27 Shiva temples under the control of the adheenam.

History & activities
The adheenam was founded during the 16th century, along with the Thiruvaduthurai Adheenam and the Thiruppanandal Adheenam, to spread the ideology of Saiva Sidhantam. Dharmapuram mutt was founded by Guru GnanaSambandar.

The adheenam is involved in publishing Saivite literature, specifically the Thevaram and Tiruvasakam and its translations. It is also involved in literary scholarship. Vaitheeswaran Koil, near Sirkazhi, is one of the temples the adheenam maintains.

The 26th Guru Maha Sannidhanam died on 4 December 2019, and was succeeded by Sri Masillamani Desiga Gnanasambanda Swamigal as the 27th Guru Maha Sannidhanam of the adheenam.

Temples under Dharmapuram Adheenam

Notes 

Hindu monasteries in India
Shaivism
Aadheenams